The Mayo Senior Hurling Championship is an annual hurling competition contested since 1923 by the top Mayo GAA clubs.

Tooreen are the current (2022) title holders, defeating Ballyhaunis in the final.

Presently the competition has four teams: Tooreen, Ballyhaunis, Castlebar & Westport. Ballina and Belmullet no longer compete.

Honours
The trophy presented to the winners is the TJ Tyrrell Cup.

The winners of the Mayo Senior Championship qualify to represent their county in the Connacht Intermediate Club Hurling Championship. The winners can, in turn, go on to play in the All-Ireland Intermediate Club Hurling Championship.

Roll of honour

List of finals

References

External links
Official Mayo Website
Mayo on Hoganstand
Mayo Club GAA
Mayo Supporters Discussion Forum

Hurling
Senior
Senior hurling county championships